The 2019 Ghazi Amanullah Khan Regional One Day Tournament was a List A cricket competition that took place in Afghanistan between 10 and 24 September 2019. It was the third edition of the competition to be played with List A status, following the announcements by the International Cricket Council (ICC) in February and May 2017. Five teams competed; Amo Region, Band-e-Amir Region, Boost Region, Mis Ainak Region and Speen Ghar Region. Boost Region were the defending champions.

Amo Region, Boost Region and Mis Ainak Region all progressed to the knockout phase of the tournament. Mis Ainak Region beat Amo Region in the eliminator match to progress to the final against Boost Region. Mis Ainak Region won the tournament, beating Boost Region by 88 runs in the final.

Fixtures

Points table

 Team qualified for the finals

Group stage

Finals

References

External links
 Series home at ESPN Cricinfo

Ghazi
Ghazi Amanullah Khan Regional One Day Tournament
Ghazi Amanullah Khan Regional One Day Tournament